Southgate is a census-designated place (CDP) in Sarasota County, Florida, United States. The population was 7,173 at the 2010 census. It is part of the Bradenton–Sarasota–Venice Metropolitan Statistical Area.

Geography
Southgate is located at  (27.308974, -82.510577).

Southgate is an older suburb of Sarasota, built in the early 1960s. Many homes in Southgate feature more "retro" styling, and almost all are one story.  The neighborhood is well kept-up, however, and is quickly becoming a place where more wealthy families reside. Property values in Southgate have skyrocketed in the last few years, and its close proximity to downtown Sarasota, beaches, and shopping makes it a very desirable place to live.

Demographics

As of the census of 2000, there were 7,455 people, 3,629 households, and 2,072 families residing in the CDP. The racial makeup of the CDP was 96.16% White, 0.80% African American, 0.21% Native American, 0.97% Asian, 0.09% Pacific Islander, 0.74% from other races, and 1.02% from two or more races. Hispanic or Latino of any race were 5.71% of the population.

There were 3,629 households, out of which 18.4% had children under the age of 18 living with them, 44.8% were married couples living together, 9.3% had a female householder with no husband present, and 42.9% were non-families. 34.9% of all households were made up of individuals, and 17.6% had someone living alone who was 65 years of age or older.  The average household size was 2.05 and the average family size was 2.62.

In the CDP, the population was spread out, with 15.7% under the age of 18, 4.7% from 18 to 24, 25.0% from 25 to 44, 27.0% from 45 to 64, and 27.6% who were 65 years of age or older.  The median age was 48 years. For every 100 females, there were 88.2 males.  For every 100 females age 18 and over, there were 85.4 males.

The median income for a household in the CDP was $41,762, and the median income for a family was $50,335. Males had a median income of $33,109 versus $26,955 for females. The per capita income for the CDP was $24,148.  About 5.1% of families and 6.8% of the population were below the poverty line, including 8.6% of those under age 18 and 4.6% of those age 65 or over.

References

Census-designated places in Sarasota County, Florida
Sarasota metropolitan area
Census-designated places in Florida